Carlos Landó is an Argentine former professional tennis player.

Landó, a world number 229 in singles, was runner-up to Carlos Kirmayr at the Rio de Janeiro Challenger in 1980. His only Challenger title came in doubles, partnering Roberto Carruthers, with whom he featured in the men's doubles main draw at the 1982 French Open. He is also known as "Picha" Lando.

ATP Challenger titles

Doubles: (1)

References

External links
 
 

Year of birth missing (living people)
Living people
Argentine male tennis players